Vanessa Villela (born January 28, 1978) is a Mexican-American actress turned real estate agent, who appeared in Mexican TV series Romántica obsesión, Ellas, inocentes o culpables, Súbete a mi moto, Un nuevo amor, El cuerpo del deseo, Decisiones,  Amores de mercado. On October 2, 2017, Villela posted that she has become an American citizen.

Filmography

Theater
El protagonista (2002)

Awards and nominations

References

External links
 

Living people
1978 births
Actresses from Mexico City
Mexican telenovela actresses
American telenovela actresses
People educated at Centro de Estudios y Formación Actoral
Singers from Mexico City
20th-century Mexican actresses
21st-century Mexican actresses
21st-century Mexican singers
21st-century Mexican women singers
20th-century American actresses
21st-century American actresses
21st-century American singers
21st-century American women singers
Mexican emigrants to the United States
People with acquired American citizenship